Sabzeh Khani (also Romanized as Sabzeh Khānī; also known as Sabz-e Khānī and Sabzeh Khānī-e Soflá) is a village in Nurabad Rural District, in the Central District of Delfan County, Lorestan Province, Iran. At the 2006 census, its population was 285, in 54 families.

References 

Towns and villages in Delfan County